Cleehill is a village in south Shropshire, England. It is sometimes written as Clee Hill Village (including the road sign entering the village) to avoid confusion. It lies in the civil parish of Caynham. The market towns of Ludlow and Cleobury Mortimer are both  distant, Ludlow to the west and Cleobury to the east.

Amenities
The village has Shropshire's highest school (the Clee Hill Community Primary School).

Cleehill has a pub (the Golden Cross), a small convenience store and post office, a fish and chips take-a-way and a bakery with a cafe.

There is a public car park by the A4117, which affords a considerable view over the Teme valley below and further into the counties of Herefordshire and Worcestershire. At the car park is a toposcope and other information boards. There are also public conveniences.

Transport
The A4117 runs through the village and there is a cattle grid stretching over this major thoroughfare due to the road running across common land. The B4214 road to Tenbury Wells starts at a junction with the A4117 in the village.

The 292 bus service (Ludlow-Cleobury-Bewdley-Kidderminster) calls at Cleehill, providing a regular service Monday to Saturday.

Sport

Climate
Although Cleehill has an oceanic climate like the rest of the U.K., it is slightly different to surrounding areas in certain months of the year and snowfall is more common in winter because of the high elevation.

Compared with the nearest Met Office weather station of Shobdon, Cleehill has colder maximum temperatures year-round, however minimum temperatures are warmer every month of the year except March and April, probably because of the reduced amount of sunshine the village receives compared to nearby areas.

Sunshine amounts are suppressed compared with nearby areas; Cleehill receives less sunshine than Shobdon in every month of the year except January.

Cleehill is also drier than surrounding areas with the exception of the months of April–July, when the village receives more rainfall. Precipitation tends to be heavier than in Shobdon, reflected in the reduced number of rainy days.

See also
Knowbury
Angelbank
Clee Hills#Terminology

References

External links

Villages in Shropshire
Mountain passes of England
Extremities of Shropshire
Mountains and hills of the United Kingdom with toposcopes